La Fattoria 2 is the second season of The Farm was held in 2005, and is one that has undergone major changes. It aired from March 16, 2005 on Canale 5 (the last season was aired on Italia 1) with the conduction of Barbara D'Urso, who has replaced Daria Bignardi as happened previously in the conduct of Grande Fratello. As posted in the location, a ranch in Brazil, was chosen Pupo.

The edition was won by Raffaello Tonon, who clashed for the final victory Sunday, May 29 with singer Mal and Patrizia Rossetti, with whom he befriended in the transmission, the final was followed by 5.696 million (with 31.58% share).

Contestants
Raffaello Tonon – TV Host.
Mal – Singer.
Patrizia Rossetti – TV Host.
Giulia Montanarini – Showgirl.
Éva Henger – Pornstar.
Ugo Conti – Actor.
Marco Basile – Actor.
Clayton Norcross – Actor.
Ramona Badescu – Showgirl.
Edoardo Costa – Actor.
Francesca Lodo – Showgirl.
Francesco Benigno – Actor.
Cristel Carrisi – Al Bano's daughter.
Jo Squillo – Singer.

Nominations

The Farm (franchise)